This is a list of civil parishes in the ceremonial county of Durham, England. The towns of Stockton-on-Tees, Darlington and Hartlepool are the only unparished areas outside the administrative county. There are 181 civil parishes.

Darlington 
The former Darlington County Borough is unparished.

 Archdeacon Newton 10
 Barmpton 10
 Bishopton 10
 Brafferton 10
 Coatham Mundeville 10
 Denton 10
 East and West Newbiggin 10
 Great Burdon 10
 Great Stainton 10
 Heighington 10
 High Coniscliffe 10
 Houghton le Side 10
 Hurworth 10
 Killerby 10
 Little Stainton 10
 Low Coniscliffe and Merrybent 10
 Middleton St George 10
 Morton Palms 10
 Neasham 10
 Piercebridge 10
 Sadberge 10
 Summerhouse 10
 Walworth 10
 Whessoe 10

County Durham 
The former Chester le Street Urban District and Consett Urban District and parts of the former Bishop Auckland Urban District, Crook and Willington Urban District and Stanley Urban District are unparished. When the City of Durham parish was formed in 2018, three areas remained unparished as the boundaries were based on wards and not aligned to those of the surrounding parishes.

 Barforth 21 
 Barnard Castle (town)2
 Barningham 21 
 Bearpark 12
 Belmont 12
 Bishop Auckland (town)3 
 Bishop Middleham 17
 Bolam 1 
 Boldron 21 
 Bournmoor 5
 Bowes 21 
 Bradbury and the Isle 17
 Brancepeth 12
 Brandon and Byshottles 4
 Brignall 21 
 Burnhope 15
 Cassop-cum-Quarrington 12
 Castle Eden 13
 Chilton (town)17
 City of Durham 11 
 Cleatlam 1 
 Cockfield 1
 Cornforth 17
 Cornsay 15
 Cotherstone 21 
 Coxhoe 12
 Croxdale and Hett 12
 Dalton-le-Dale 13
 Dene Valley 3
 Easington Colliery 13
 Easington Village 13
 Edmondbyers 25 
 Edmondsley  5
 Eggleston 1
 Egglestone Abbey 21 
 Eldon 18
 Esh 15
 Etherley 1
 Evenwood and Barony 1
 Ferryhill (town)17
 Fishburn 17
 Forest and Frith 1
 Framwellgate Moor 12
 Gainford 1
 Gilmonby 21 
 Great Aycliffe (town)10 17 18
 Great Lumley  5
 Greater Willington (town)8 
 Greencroft 15
 Hamsterley 1
 Hamsterley Common 1 
 Haswell 13
 Hawthorn 13
 Headlam 1 
 Healeyfield 15
 Hedleyhope 15
 Hilton 1 
 Holwick 21 
 Hope 21 
 Horden 13
 Hunderthwaite 21
 Hunstanworth 25 
 Hutton Henry 13
 Hutton Magna 21 
 Ingleton 1 
 Kelloe 12
 Kimblesworth and Plawsworth 5 12
 Lanchester 15
 Langleydale and Shotton 1 
 Langton 1 
 Lartington 21 
 Little Lumley  5
 Lunedale 21 
 Lynesack and Softley 1 
 Marwood 1 
 Mickleton 21 
 Middleton in Teesdale 1 
 Middridge 18
 Monk Hesleden 13
 Mordon 17
 Morton Tinmouth 1 
 Muggleswick 15
 Murton 13
 Nesbitt 13
 Newbiggin 1 
 North Lodge  5
 Ouston  5
 Ovington 21
 Pelton  5
 Peterlee (town)13
 Pittington 12
 Raby with Keverstone 1 
 Rokeby 21 
 Romaldkirk 21 
 Sacriston  5
 Satley 15
 Scargill 21 
 Seaham (town)16
 Seaton with Slingley 13
 Sedgefield (town)17
 Shadforth 12
 Sheraton with Hulam 13
 Sherburn Village 12 
 Shildon (town)18
 Shincliffe 12
 Shotton 13
 South Bedburn 1 
 South Hetton 13
 Spennymoor (town)19
 Staindrop 1
 Stanhope 25 
 Stanley (town)20 
 Startforth 21 
 Streatlam and Stainton 1 
 Thornley 13
 Tow Law (town)24
 Trimdon 17
 Trimdon Foundry 13
 Urpeth  5
 Waldridge 5
 Wackerfield 1 
 Weather Hill Wood 4 12 
 West Auckland 3
 West Rainton and Leamside 12
 Westwick 1 
 Wheatley Hill 13
 Whorlton 1 
 Windlestone 17
 Wingate 13
 Winston 1 
 Witton Gilbert 12
 Witton-le-Wear 8
 Wolsingham 25
 Wolsingham Park Moor 25 
 Woodland 1 
 Wycliffe with Thorpe 21

Hartlepool 
Part of the former Hartlepool County Borough is unparished.

 Brierton  22
 Claxton   22
 Dalton Piercy  22
 Elwick  22
 Greatham  22
 Hart  22
 Headland 14
 Newton Bewley 22
 Wynyard

Stockton-on-Tees 
Part of the former Teesside County Borough is unparished. For the part of the borough south of the River Tees, see List of civil parishes in North Yorkshire.

 Aislaby 22
 Billingham (town)23 
 Carlton 22
 Egglescliffe 22
 Elton 22
 Grindon and Thorpe Thewles 22
 Longnewton 22
 Newsham 22
 Preston-on-Tees 22
 Redmarshall 22
 Stillington and Whitton 17 22
 Wolviston 22
 Wynyard 22

Notes 

 Formerly Barnard Castle Rural District
 Formerly Barnard Castle Urban District
 Formerly Bishop Auckland Urban District
 Formerly Brandon and Byshottles Urban District
 Formerly Chester-le-Street Rural District
 Formerly Chester le Street Urban District
 Formerly Consett Urban District
 Formerly Crook and Willington Urban District
 Formerly Darlington County Borough
 Formerly Darlington Rural District
 Formerly Durham Municipal Borough
 Formerly Durham Rural District
 Formerly Easington Rural District
 Formerly Hartlepool County Borough
 Formerly Lanchester Rural District
 Formerly Seaham Urban District
 Formerly Sedgefield Rural District
 Formerly Shildon Urban District
 Formerly Spennymoor Urban District
 Formerly Stanley Urban District
 Formerly Startforth Rural District
 Formerly Stockton Rural District
 Formerly Teesside County Borough
 Formerly Tow Law Urban District
 Formerly Weardale Rural District

References

See also
 List of civil parishes in England

External links
 Office for National Statistics : Geographical Area Listings

Durham
 
Civil parishes